Shastasaurus ("Mount Shasta lizard") is an extinct genus of very large ichthyosaur from the middle and late Triassic, and is the largest known marine reptile. Specimens have been found in the United States, Canada, and China.

Description

Shastasaurus lived during the late Triassic period. The type species Shastasaurus pacificus is known from California. A second possible species of Shastasaurus, S.  sikanniensis, is known from the Pardonet Formation British Columbia, dating to the middle Norian age (about 210 million years ago).

Shastasaurus was highly specialized, and differed considerably from other ichthyosaurs. It was very slender in profile. Due to its unusually short, toothless snout (compared to the long, toothed, dolphin-like snouts of most ichthyosaurs) it was proposed that Shastasaurus was a suction feeder, feeding primarily on soft-bodied cephalopods, although current research indicates ichthyosaur jaws do not fit the suction-feeding profile.

It is unknown whether Shastasaurus had a dorsal fin, however, the more basal ichthyosaur Mixosaurus had dorsal fin. The upper fluke of the tail was probably much less developed than the shark-like tails found in later species.

Species and synonyms

The type species of Shastasaurus is S. pacificus, from the late Carnian of northern California. It is known only from fragmentary remains, which have led to the assumption that it was a 'normal' ichthyosaur in terms of proportions, especially skull proportions. Several species of long-snouted ichthyosaur were referred to Shastasaurus based on this misinterpretation, but are now placed in other genera (including Callawayia and Guizhouichthyosaurus).
 
Shastasaurus may include a second species, Shastasaurus liangae. It is known from several good specimens, and was originally placed in the separate genus Guanlingsaurus. Complete skulls show that it had an unusual short and toothless snout. S. pacificus probably also had a short snout, although its skull is incompletely known. S. sikanniensis was originally described in 2004 as a large species of Shonisaurus. However, this classification was not based on any phylogenetic analysis, and the authors also noted similarities with Shastasaurus. The first study testing its relationships, in 2011, supported the hypothesis that it was indeed more closely related to Shastasaurus than to Shonisaurus, and it was reclassified as Shastasaurus sikanniensis. However, a 2013 analysis supported the original classification, finding it more closely related to Shonisaurus than to Shastasaurus. In the 2019 study, S. sikanniensis was pertained within the genus Shastasaurus. In the 2021 analysis, S. sikanniensis forms a clade with Shonisaurus, indicating that it is closer to Shonisaurus than to Shastasaurus. Specimens belonging to S. sikanniensis have been found in the Pardonet Formation British Columbia, dating to the middle Norian age (about 210 million years ago).

In 2009, Shang & Li reclassified the species Guizhouichthyosaurus tangae as Shastasaurus tangae. However, later analysis showed that Guizhouichthyosaurus was in fact closer to more advanced ichthyosaurs, and so cannot be considered a species of Shastasaurus.

Dubious species that were referred to this genus include S. carinthiacus (Huene, 1925) from the Austrian Alps and S. neubigi (Sander, 1997) from the German Muschelkalk. S. neubigi, however, was re-described and reassigned to its own genus, Phantomosaurus.

Synonyms of S. / G. liangae:
Guanlingichthyosaurus liangae Wang et al., 2008 (lapsus calami)

Synonyms of S. pacificus:
Shastasaurus alexandrae Merriam, 1902
Shastasaurus osmonti Merriam, 1902

See also
 List of ichthyosaurs
 Timeline of ichthyosaur research
 Shonisaurus

References

Middle Triassic ichthyosaurs
Late Triassic ichthyosaurs of North America
Middle Triassic reptiles of Asia
Middle Triassic reptiles of North America
Late Triassic reptiles of Asia
Triassic California
Ichthyosauromorph genera
Fossils of Canada
Triassic Canada